Wrixum (Fering: Wraksem, Danish: Vriksum) is a municipality on the island of Föhr, in the district of Nordfriesland, in Schleswig-Holstein, Germany.

Geography and traffic
Wrixum is one of eleven municipalities on Föhr and it is situated directly at the town limits of Wyk auf Föhr. The place enjoys a good bus service and features several bicycle rentals.

Politics
The WWG holds all nine seats of the municipal council since the elections of 2008.

Arms
Blazon: Or. In a hill vert over a wavy base argent, therein waves azure, a wind mill argent. In chief two oystercatchers proper, facing.

Town twinning
Wrixum has been twinned with Aub in Lower Franconia since 1998.

Economy
There are many small enterprises in Wrixum, yet tourism remains the most important economic factor.

Sights
A landmark of Wrixum is the wind mill which was erected in 1851.

References

External links

Wrixum

Föhr
Nordfriesland